CA45, CA-45, or CA 45 may refer to:

 California's 45th congressional district, a congressional district in the U.S. state of California
 California State Route 45, a state highway in California
 , a United States Navy cruiser
 Calcium-45 (Ca-45 or 45Ca), an isotope of calcium
 Caproni Ca.45, an Italian aircraft